Hugh Calvin "Puss" Whelchel (July 20, 1900 – April 1, 1968) was an American college football player.

Early years
Hugh was born on July 20, 1900 in Dahlonega, Georgia to Henry Cowan Whelchel and Clara Annabel Moore. Hugh was a first cousin of Georgia Tech football player Dan Whelchel.

University of Georgia
He was a prominent guard for the Georgia Bulldogs of the University of Georgia from 1919 to 1922. He was said to have blocked 19 kicks in his college football career. Whelchel was a member of the Alpha Tau Omega fraternity. He was nominated though not selected for an Associated Press All-Time Southeast 1869-1919 era team.

1920
His kick blocking featured in the 21–14 victory over Alabama in 1920. Buck Cheves returned the block 87 yards for a touchdown and the win, ranked fourth in The 50 Greatest Plays In Georgia Bulldogs Football History. Georgia was 8–0–1 and SIAA champions in 1920, as well as the first team known as the "Bulldogs."

1921
He was selected as a third-team All-American by Walter Camp in 1921.

1922
Whelchel was unanimously elected captain of the 1922 team. Camp gave him honorable mention.

References

External links
 

1968 deaths
1900 births
American football guards
Georgia Bulldogs football players
People from Dahlonega, Georgia
Players of American football from Georgia (U.S. state)
All-Southern college football players